Valerie June Jarrett ( Bowman; born November 14, 1956) is an American businesswoman and former government official. She currently serves as the Chief Executive Officer of the Obama Foundation. She previously served as the senior advisor to U.S. President Barack Obama and assistant to the president for public engagement and intergovernmental affairs from 2009 to 2017. Before that, she served as a co-chair of the Obama–Biden Transition Project.

She has been the CEO of the Obama Foundation since October 2021.

Early life and education 
Jarrett was born in Shiraz, Iran, during the Shah's rule, to American parents James E. Bowman and Barbara T. Bowman. Her father, a pathologist and geneticist, worked at a hospital in Shiraz in 1956. When she was five years old, the family moved to London for a year, later moving to Chicago in 1963.

Her parents are of African-American and European descent. On the television series Finding Your Roots, DNA testing indicated that Jarrett is of 49% European, 46% African, and 5% Native American descent. Among her European roots, she was found to have French and Scottish ancestry. One of her maternal great-grandfathers, Robert Robinson Taylor, was the first accredited African-American architect, and the first African-American student enrolled at the Massachusetts Institute of Technology. Jarrett's father once told her that her great-grandfather was Jewish. Her maternal grandfather, Robert Rochon Taylor, was chairman of the Chicago Housing Authority in the 1940s.

As a child, Jarrett spoke Persian, French, and English. In 1966, her mother was one of four child advocates who created the Erikson Institute. The institute was established to provide collective knowledge in child development for teachers and other professionals working with young children. 

Jarrett graduated from Northfield Mount Hermon School in 1974, and earned a B.A. in psychology from Stanford University in 1978 and a Juris Doctor (J.D.) from the University of Michigan Law School in 1981. On May 21, 2016, she received the honorary degree of Doctor of Laws from Colby College in Waterville, Maine.

Career

Chicago municipal politics
Jarrett got her start in Chicago politics in 1987 working for Mayor Harold Washington as deputy corporation counsel for finance and development.

Jarrett continued to work in the Chicago mayor's office in the 1990s. She was deputy chief of staff for Mayor Richard Daley, during which time (1991) she hired Michelle Robinson (Michelle Obama), then engaged to Barack Obama, away from a private law firm. Jarrett served as commissioner of the department of planning and development from 1992 through 1995, and she was chairwoman of the Chicago Transit Authority from 1995 to 2003.

Business administration
Until joining the Obama administration, Jarrett was the CEO of the Habitat Company, a real estate development and management company, which she joined in 1995. She was replaced by Mark Segal, an attorney who joined the company in 2002, as CEO. Daniel E. Levin is the chairman of Habitat, which was formed in 1971. Jarrett was a member of the board of Chicago Stock Exchange (2000–2007, as chairman, 2004–2007).

Jarrett was a member of the board of trustees of the University of Chicago Medical Center from 1996 to 2009, becoming vice chairwoman in 2002 and chairwoman in 2006. She also served as vice chairwoman of the board of trustees of the University of Chicago and a trustee of the Museum of Science and Industry in Chicago. Jarrett serves on the board of directors of USG Corporation, a Chicago-based building materials corporation.

Advisor to Barack Obama

Jarrett was one of President Obama's longest serving advisors and confidantes and was "widely tipped for a high-profile position in an Obama administration."

On November 14, 2008, President-elect Barack Obama selected Jarrett to serve as a senior advisor to the president and assistant to the president for intergovernmental relations and public liaison.

Jarrett was one of three senior advisors to President Obama. She held the retitled position of assistant to the president for intergovernmental affairs and public engagement, managed the White House Office of Public Engagement and Intergovernmental Affairs, and Office of Urban Affairs; she also chaired the White House Council on Women and Girls and the White House Office of Olympic, Paralympic, and Youth Sport. She was part of the U.S. State Visit to the UK in May 2011.

She said that the 2011 report Women in America, which the administration produced for the Council on Women and Girls, would be used to guide policy-making.

Jarrett had a staff of approximately three dozen and received full-time Secret Service protection. Jarrett's role as both a friend of the Obamas and as senior advisor in the White House was controversial:  in his memoirs Robert M. Gates, former secretary of defense, discussed his objection to her involvement in foreign security affairs; David Axelrod reported in his memoirs about Rahm Emanuel's attempts to have her selected as Obama's replacement in the senate, due to concerns about the difficulty in working with a family friend in a major policy role.

Additional leadership positions
In addition to being senior advisor to the president, Jarrett held other leadership positions and completed further duties. Among those included chairing the White House Council on Women and Girls and co-chairing the White House Task Force to Protect Students from Sexual Assault. In March 2014, she participated as a speaker on Voices in Leadership, an original Harvard T. H. Chan School of Public Health webcast series, in a discussion entitled, "Leadership in the White House," moderated by Dr. Atul Gawande.

Relationship with the Obamas 

In 1991, as deputy chief of staff to Mayor Richard Daley, Jarrett interviewed Michelle Robinson for an opening in the mayor's office, after which she immediately offered Robinson the job. Robinson asked for time to think and also asked Jarrett to meet her fiancé, Barack Obama. The three ended up meeting for dinner. After the dinner, Robinson accepted the job with the mayor's office. It was at this time that Jarrett reportedly took the couple under her wing and "introduced them to a wealthier and better-connected Chicago than their own." When Jarrett later left her position at the mayor's office to head the Chicago department of planning and development, Michelle Obama went with her.

Support for 2008 US Presidential Election
Obama's election team and supporters, for example at the Philadelphia National Constitution Center speech, included Valerie Jarrett, David Plouffe and David Axelrod, all whom later joined him and First Lady Michelle Obama in the White House.

Post-Obama administration 
Since leaving the White House, Jarrett has volunteered as a senior advisor to the Obama Foundation. In 2017 she was appointed to the board of directors of Ariel Investments, and joined the board of directors of 2U, Inc., Lyft, and the Kennedy Center for the Performing Arts. She is also the co-chair of the United State of Women, chair of the Board of When We All Vote, and a senior advisor to ATTN:. In January 2018 she became a distinguished senior fellow at the University of Chicago Law School.

In July 2017 Jarrett signed a deal with Viking Press for her book titled Finding My Voice: My Journey to the West Wing and the Path Forward.

In December 2020, following the announcement that Obama Foundation President Wally Adeyemo would be nominated to become Deputy Secretary of the Treasury, the Foundation announced that Jarrett would take over his duties on an interim basis until a successor can be found.

In popular culture 
Along with Donna Brazile, vice chairwoman of the Democratic National Committee, she is one of the political figures to make a cameo appearance as herself in the CBS drama The Good Wife.

In 2018, Jarrett called ABC to demand the firing of actress and comedian Roseanne Barr after Barr tweeted "muslim brotherhood & planet of the apes had a baby=vj" on Twitter.

Personal life 
In 1983 she married William Robert Jarrett, son of Chicago Sun-Times reporter Vernon Jarrett. She attributes her switch from a private to a public career to the birth of their daughter, and her own desire to do something that would make their daughter proud. Her daughter, Laura Jarrett, was an attorney and reporter for CNN and is now a senior 
legal correspondent at NBC , and daughter-in-law of the Canadian politician Bas Balkissoon.

To one reporter's emailed question about her divorce, she replied, "Married in 1983, separated in 1987, and divorced in 1988. Enough said." In a Vogue profile, she further explained, "We grew up together. We were friends since childhood. In a sense, he was the boy next door. I married without really appreciating how hard divorce would be." William Jarrett died on November 19, 1993, at age 40, and at the time of his death he was director of obstetrics and gynecology at Jackson Park Hospital.

In 2018, Jarrett was the target of an offensive tweet by Roseanne Barr. Barr said, in reference to Jarrett, it was as though the “muslim brotherhood and planet of the apes had a baby”. In response to her attack on Jarrett, Barr was released by her talent agency ICM and lost her television role on Roseanne.

References

External links

Valerie Jarrett at Whitehouse.gov (archived at obamawhitehouse.archives.gov)

|-

1956 births
21st-century American women politicians
21st-century American politicians
African-American lawyers
African-American women in politics
African-American women lawyers
American expatriates in Iran
American people of French descent
American people of Scottish descent
American women chief executives
American women lawyers
Illinois Democrats
Illinois lawyers
Living people
Northfield Mount Hermon School alumni
Obama administration personnel
People from Shiraz
Politicians from Chicago
Senior Advisors to the President of the United States
Stanford University alumni
University of Chicago Laboratory Schools alumni
University of Michigan Law School alumni
Women in Illinois politics